F Lalrinpuia (born 3 October 1989) is an Indian professional footballer who plays as a forward for Mizoram Police in the Mizoram Premier League.

Career
Born in Mizoram, Lalrinpuia began his career with Mizoram Police in the Mizoram Premier League. He then joined Chanmari, where he played for the side in the I-League 2nd Division. He also represented Mizoram in the Santosh Trophy and helped the state win their first championship in the tournament.

On 16 January 2016 Lalrinpuia made his professional debut with newly promoted I-League club, Aizawl, against Bengaluru FC. He came on as a 79th minute substitute as Aizawl lost 1–0.

Mizoram Police
After spending the season with Aizawl, Lalrinpuia returned to Mizoram Police for the 2016–17 and 2017–18 Mizoram Premier League seasons.

Lalrinpuia was also part of the Mizoram side that participated in the Santosh Trophy in 2016, 2017, and 2018. On 20 March 2018, Lalrinpuia scored the equalizer for Mizoram in their opening match of the 2017–18 edition against Goa.

Career statistics

References

External links 
 Aizawl Football Club Profile.

1989 births
Living people
People from Mizoram
Indian footballers
Chanmari FC players
Aizawl FC players
Association football forwards
Footballers from Mizoram
I-League 2nd Division players
I-League players